Heidi Suzanne Julavits (born April 20, 1969) is an American author and was a founding editor of The Believer magazine. She has been published in The Best Creative Nonfiction Vol. 2, Esquire, Culture+Travel, Story, Zoetrope All-Story, and McSweeney’s Quarterly. Her novels include The Mineral Palace (2000), The Effect of Living Backwards (2003), The Uses of Enchantment (2006), and  The Vanishers (2012). She is an associate professor of writing at Columbia University. She is a recipient of the PEN New England Award.

Early life
Heidi Julavits was born and grew up in Portland, Maine, before attending Dartmouth College. She later went on to earn an MFA from Columbia University.

Career

The Believer and others
Julavits wrote the article "Rejoice! Believe! Be Strong and Read Hard!" (subtitled: "A Call For A New Era Of Experimentation, and a Book Culture That Will Support It") in the debut issue of The Believer, a publication that attempts to avoid snarkiness and "give people and books the benefit of the doubt."

In 2005, she told The New York Times Magazine culture writer A.O. Scott how she decided on The Believers tone: "I really saw 'the end of the book' as originating in the way books are talked about now in our culture and especially in the most esteemed venues for book criticism. It seemed as though their irrelevance was a foregone conclusion, and we were just practicing this quaint exercise of pretending something mattered when of course everyone knew it didn't." She added that her own aim as book critic would be "to endow something with importance, by treating it as an emotional experience."

She has also written short stories, such as "The Santosbrazzi Killer", first published in The Lifted Brow and then republished in Harper's Magazine.

Novels
Julavits is the author of four novels: The Mineral Palace (2000), about which Library Journal wrote, "the writing is superb"; The Effect of Living Backwards (2003); The Uses of Enchantment (2006), which The New Yorker called "a sophisticated meditation on truth and bias" and Publishers Weekly described as "beautifully executed"; and The Vanishers (2012).

Other work
Julavits co-edited Women in Clothes (2014), along with Sheila Heti and Leanne Shapton. The book is about how the clothing women wear defines and shapes their lives, and it features the voices of 639 women of all nationalities.

Julavits is the author of the book The Folded Clock: A Diary (2015), which the Los Angeles Times described as "an engaging portrait of a woman's sense of identity, which continually shape-shifts with time."

Personal life
Julavits lives in Maine and Manhattan with her husband, the writer Ben Marcus, and their children.

Bibliography

Novels

Other works

Short fiction

Short nonfiction

References

External links

 
 

1968 births
Living people
American magazine editors
20th-century American novelists
Columbia University School of the Arts alumni
Columbia University faculty
Dartmouth College alumni
Writers from Manhattan
Writers from Portland, Maine
21st-century American novelists
American women novelists
20th-century American women writers
21st-century American women writers
20th-century American short story writers
21st-century American short story writers
Journalists from New York City
Novelists from New York (state)
Novelists from Maine
American women non-fiction writers
20th-century American non-fiction writers
21st-century American non-fiction writers
Women magazine editors
The Believer (magazine) people
American women academics